Auxentius might refer to:

 Auxentius of Mopsuestia (died 360), Christian bishop and saint
 Auxentius of Milan (died 374), Arian Christian theologian and bishop
 Auxentius of Durostorum and Milan (died c. 400), Arian Christian theologian and bishop
 Auxentius of Bithynia or Saint Auxentius (died 473), hermit, and Eastern Orthodox and Roman Catholic saint
 Auxentius (bug), a genus of stink bugs in the tribe Halyini

See also
 Audentius (disambiguation)